Court is one of the ten district electoral areas (DEA) in Belfast, Northern Ireland. Located in the north and west of the city, the district elects six members to Belfast City Council and contains the wards of Ballygomartin, Clonard, Falls, Forth River, Shankill, and Woodvale. Court is split between the Belfast North and Belfast West constituencies for the Northern Ireland Assembly and UK Parliament.

History

The DEA was created for the 1985 local elections. It initially contained six wards, three of which came from the abolished Area E, with the remainder from Area G. From the 1993 through 2011 local elections, it contained five wards, namely Crumlin, Glencairn, Highfield, Shankill and Woodvale, following the abolition of the Saint Anne's ward. For the 2014 local elections, the Crumlin ward was abolished, the Glencairn ward was replaced by Forth River ward and the Highfield ward was replaced by Ballygomartin ward. These four wards were joined by the Falls and Clonard wards, which had previously been part of the abolished Lower Falls District Electoral Area.

2011 census data

Councillors

See also

Shankill Road
Belfast City Council
Electoral wards of Belfast
Local government in Northern Ireland 
Members of Belfast City Council

Elections 

2019 Belfast City Council election
2014 Belfast City Council election
2011 Belfast City Council election
2005 Northern Ireland local elections § Belfast 
2001 Northern Ireland local elections § Belfast 
1997 Northern Ireland local elections § Belfast
1993 Northern Ireland local elections § Belfast
1989 Northern Ireland local elections § Belfast
1985 Northern Ireland local elections § Belfast

References

Electoral wards of Belfast
1985 establishments in Northern Ireland